Pat Parker (born Patricia Cooks; January 20, 1944June 17, 1989) was an American poet and activist. Both her poetry and her activism drew from her experiences as an African-American lesbian feminist. Her poetry spoke about her tough childhood growing up in poverty, dealing with sexual assault, and the murder of a sister. At eighteen, Parker was in an abusive relationship and had a miscarriage after being pushed down a flight of stairs. After two divorces she came out as lesbian "embracing her sexuality" and said she was liberated and "knew no limits when it came to expressing the innermost parts of herself". 

Parker participated in political activism and had early involvement with the Black Panther Party and Black Women's Revolutionary Council, and formed the Women's Press Collective. She participated in many forms of activism especially regarding gay and lesbian communities, domestic violence, and rights of people of color. She released five poetry collections: Child of Myself (1972), Pit Stop (1975), Movement in Black (1978), Woman Slaughter (1978), and Jonestown and Other Madness (1985).

Early life 
Pat was born on January 20, 1944, in Houston, Texas, to Marie Louise (née Anderson) and Ernest Nathaniel Cooks. Marie Louise worked as a domestic worker and Ernest retreaded tires. She was the youngest of four daughters. The family lived first in the Third Ward and then moved to the Sunnyside neighborhood when Parker was four years old.

She left home at seventeen and moved to Los Angeles to attend college. She attended Los Angeles City College and also was enrolled in San Francisco State College from 1966 to 1967 but did not graduate. (In an NEA application for 1988, Parker writes that she studied at San Francisco State University in Creative Writing but did not attain a degree.) She married playwright Ed Bullins in 1962. Both Bullis and Parker became involved in the Black Panther Party in the 1960s.

Parker and Bullins separated after four years. She later said that her ex-husband was physically violent and that she was "scared to death". She married Robert F. Parker, writer and publisher, but decided that the "idea of marriage... wasn't working" for her. She began to identify as a lesbian in the late 1960s, and, in a 1975 interview with Anita Cornwell stated: "after my first relationship with a woman, I knew where I was going."

Career 
Parker worked from 1978 to 1988 as the executive director of the Oakland Feminist Women's Health Center. In 1979 she toured with the "Varied Voices of Black Women", a group of poets and musicians that included Linda Tillery, Mary Watkins, and Gwen Avery.  She founded the Black Women's Revolutionary Council in 1980, and she also contributed to the formation of the Women's Press Collective, as well as being involved in wide-ranging activism in gay and lesbian organizing.

Pat Parker was asked by her father to take "the freedom train of education," Parker moved to Oakland California, in the early 1970s to pursue writing and potential opportunities for activist work. Pat Parker worked from 1978 to 1987 as a medical coordinator at the Oakland Feminist Women's Health Center, which Parker helped to expand. Parker also participated in political activism and had early involvement with the Black Panther Party, Black Women's Revolutionary Council and formed the Women's Press Collective. Parker participated in many forms of activism especially regarding gay and lesbian communities, domestic violence, and rights of people of color.

Writing 
Parker gave her first public poetry reading in 1963 in Oakland. In 1968, she began to read her poetry to women's groups at women's bookstores, coffeehouses and feminist events.

Judy Grahn, a fellow poet and a personal friend, identifies Pat Parker's poetry as a part of the "continuing Black tradition of radical poetry".

Cheryl Clarke, another poet and peer, identifies her as a "lead voice and caller" in the world of lesbian poetry. Designed to confront both black and women's communities with, as Clarke notes, "the precariousness of being non-white, non-male, non-heterosexual in a racist, misogynist, homophobic, imperial culture. Clarke believes that Parker articulates, "a black lesbian-feminist perspective of love between women and the circumstances that prevent our intimacy and liberation."

Parker and Audre Lorde first met in 1969 and continued to exchange letters and visits until Parker's death in 1989. Their collaboration inspired many, including lesbian-feminist blues/R&B singer Nedra Johnson, whose song "Where Will You Be?" has become something of a feminist anthem in the USA. Audre Lorde and Pat Parker shared common themes within poetry they wrote as well. Audre Lorde's piece "The Transformation of Silence into Language and Action" talks extensively about action through language, a similar concept seen in Pat Parker's "Where will you be".

Womanslaughter 
Parker's elder sister, Shirley Jones, was shot and killed by her husband. Parker wrote the autobiographical poem, Womanslaughter (1978), based on this event.

In the poem, Parker notes that

Her things were his
including her life.

The perpetrator was convicted of "womanslaughter", not murder, because

Men cannot kill their wives.
They passion them to death.

He served a one-year sentence in a work-release program. Parker brought this crime to the International Tribunal on Crimes against Women in 1976 in Brussels, vowing

I will come to my sisters
not dutiful,
I will come strong.

In 2014, the small independent press Ra'av (Hebrew for Hunger) published a wide selection of Parker's work in Israel. The three translators Yael "belly" Levi-Hazan, Yael (yali) Dekel and Hani Kavdiel succeeded in channeling Parker's work in Hebrew. The book became an instant hit, gaining the love of critics and readers alike.

Death 
Parker died on June 19, 1989, of breast cancer at the age 45 in Oakland, California. The national lesbian-feminist community mourned her loss, and several things have been named after her, such as Pat Parker Place, a community center in Chicago. She was survived by her long-time partner, Marty Dunham, and her daughters Cassidy Brown and Anastasia Jean.

Tributes 
The Pat Parker/Vito Russo Center Library in New York City is named in honor of Parker and fellow writer, Vito Russo.

The Pat Parker Poetry Award is awarded each year for a free verse narrative poem or dramatic monologue by a black lesbian poet.

In 2004, composer Awilda Villarini used Parker's text for her song "Dialogue."

In June 2019, Parker was one of the inaugural fifty American "pioneers, trailblazers, and heroes" inducted on the National LGBTQ Wall of Honor within the Stonewall National Monument (SNM) in New York City's Stonewall Inn. The SNM is the first U.S. national monument dedicated to LGBTQ rights and history, and the wall's unveiling was timed to take place during the 50th anniversary of the Stonewall riots.

Works 
"Pat Parker, Where Will You Be". YouTube.

Books 
Child of Myself (1972), The Women's Press Collective
Pit Stop (1973), The Women's Press Collective
Womanslaughter (1978), Diana Press
Movement in Black (1978), Diana Press
Jonestown & Other Madness (1989), Firebrand Books
Movement in Black: The Collected Poetry of Pat Parker, 1961–1978; includes work from Child of Myself and Pit Stop, foreword by Audre Lorde, introduction by Judy Grahn, Diana Press (Oakland, California), 1978, expanded edition, introduction by Cheryl Clarke, Firebrand Books (Ithaca, New York), 1999

Non-fiction 
 Unleashing Feminism: Critiquing Lesbian Sadomasochism in the Gay Nineties (1993) (with Anna Livia Julian Brawn and Kathy Miriam)

Select anthologies 
Amazon Poetry: An Anthology of Lesbian Poetry (1975)
Where Would I Be Without You? The Poetry of Pat Parker and Judy Grahn, 1976 Sound Recording Olivia Records
Lesbian Concentrate. Sound Recording, 1977, Olivia Records
"Revolution: It's Not Neat or Pretty or Quick" in Cherríe Moraga and Gloria Anzaldúa (eds), This Bridge Called My Back, Watertown, Massachusetts: Persephone Press, 1981.
Home Girls: A Black Feminist Anthology (1983)
I Never Told Anyone: Writings by Women Survivors of Child Sexual Abuse (1991)
Plexus

See also 
 List of feminist poets
 Lesbian poetry

References

Sources 
 McEwen, Christian, editor, Naming the Waves: Contemporary Lesbian Poetry, Virago (New York City), 1988.
 Moraga, Cherríe, and Gloria Anzaldúa, This Bridge Called My Back: Writings by Radical Women of Color, Women of Color Press, 1981.
 Parker, Pat, Jonestown and Other Madness, Firebrand Books, 1985.
 Parker, Pat, Movement in Black: The Collected Poetry of Pat Parker, 1961–1978, foreword by Audre Lorde, introduction by Judy Grahn, Diana Press (Oakland, California), 1978, expanded edition, introduction by Cheryl Clarke, Firebrand Books (Ithaca, New York), 1999.
 Booklist, March 15, 1999, p. 1279.
 Callaloo, Winter 1986, pp. 259–62.
 Colby Library Quarterly (Waterville, ME), March 1982, pp. 9–25.
 Conditions: Six, 1980, p. 217.
 Feminist Review, Spring 1990, pp. 4–7.
 Library Journal, July 1985, p. 77.
 Margins, Vol. 23, 1987, pp. 60–61.
 Women's Review of Books, April 1986, pp. 17–19.
 Blain, Virginia, Patricia Clements, and Isobel Grundy. The Feminist Companion to Literature in English: Women Writers from the Middle Ages to the Present. New Haven, Connecticut: Yale University Press, 1990: 833.
 Oktenberg, Adrian. In Women's Review of Books (Wellesley, Massachusetts), April 1986: 17–19.
 Ridinger, Robert B. Marks. "Pat Parker", in Gay & Lesbian Literature. Detroit, Michigan: St. James Press, 1994: 289–290.

External links 

 Papers of Pat Parker,Schlesinger Library, Radcliffe Institute, Harvard University.

1944 births
1989 deaths
American feminist writers
American lesbian writers
LGBT African Americans
LGBT people from Texas
African-American feminists
Members of the Black Panther Party
Los Angeles City College alumni
Activists from Houston
San Francisco State University alumni
Deaths from breast cancer
Deaths from cancer in California
African-American women writers
Lesbian feminists
Radical feminists
20th-century American women writers
20th-century American poets
African-American poets
American women poets
Women's music
Lambda Literary Award for Lesbian Poetry winners
American LGBT poets
Activists from Oakland, California